John Arthur Amaratunge, MBE, JP, UM was a Ceylonese politician. He was the Minister of Information and Broadcasting and Parliamentary Secretary to the Minister of Planning and Economic Affairs (which was under the Prime Minister) in the Third Dudley Senanayake cabinet and an appointed member of the Senate of Ceylon from the United National Party. A closed confidant of Dudley Senanayake, in the 1950s he served as member of the Gal Oya Development Board and was appointed a Member of the Order of the British Empire (MBE) in the 1951 Birthday Honours.

References

Members of the Senate of Ceylon
Ceylonese Members of the Order of the British Empire
United National Party politicians
Sinhalese politicians
Sri Lankan Justices of the Peace and Unofficial magistrates